Atlantic Highway can refer to the following:
Part of the A39 road in England
Atlantic Highway (United States), an auto trail replaced by U.S. Route 1
Atlantic Ocean Road, also the Atlantic Road, in Norway

See also
Pacific Highway (disambiguation)